York is an unincorporated community and census-designated place (CDP) in Lewis and Clark County, Montana, United States. It sits at the southwestern base of the Big Belt Mountains, in the valley of Trout Creek, which flows southwest to the Missouri River in Hauser Lake.

York was first listed as a CDP prior to the 2020 census.

Demographics

References 

Census-designated places in Lewis and Clark County, Montana
Census-designated places in Montana